Anders Østre Pedersen (born 4 May 1991 in Lørenskog) is a Norwegian competitive sailor.

He qualified for competing in the Finn class at the 2016 Summer Olympics in Rio de Janeiro.

References

External links
 
 
 
 

1991 births
Living people
Norwegian male sailors (sport)
Olympic sailors of Norway
Sailors at the 2016 Summer Olympics – Finn
World Champions in 5.5 Metre
World champions in sailing for Norway
People from Lørenskog
Sailors at the 2020 Summer Olympics – Finn
Sportspeople from Viken (county)